Kiwa Station is the name of two train stations in Japan:

 Kiwa Station (Wakayama) (紀和駅)
 Kiwa Station (Yamaguchi) (岐波駅)